Stuart McCall (1942 – 2002) was a Canadian politician who served on the Yukon Territorial Council, representing the electoral district of Pelly River from 1974 to 1978.

Originally from Manchester, England, McCall moved to Canada as a young adult. He settled in Faro, Yukon, working in the local mines and rising to become a leader in the labour union local. He was elected to the territorial council in the 1974 election, winning the seat by just ten votes over Paul White. In the legislature, he was particularly prominent as a defender of labour rights, particularly when workers in Faro's mines staged a wildcat strike. Despite their significantly different ideologies, however, he was a close friend of council colleague Ken McKinnon, with both men frequently dining with each other's families when the council was in session.

In the 1978 election, the first conventional partisan election to the new Legislative Assembly of Yukon, McCall ran as a Yukon New Democratic Party candidate in the new electoral district of Faro, but was defeated by independent candidate Maurice Byblow. He left the territory in 1980, moving to Zeballos, British Columbia to take a job as foreman in the municipal public works department. He held that job until 1992, when he retired to work for himself as an independent contractor. During his time in Zeballos, he also spent eight years as a trustee on the town's school district board.

He died on July 27, 2002 at his home in Zeballos.

Electoral record

|-

| Independent
| Stuart McCall
| align="right"| 187
| align="right"| 35.68
| align="right"| –

| Independent
| Paul White
| align="right"| 177
| align="right"| 33.77
| align="right"| –

| Independent
| Barry Redfern
| align="right"| 160
| align="right"| 30.53
| align="right"| –
|-
! align=left colspan=3|Total
! align=right| 524
! align=right| 100.0%
! align=right| –

|-

| Independent
| Maurice Byblow
| align="right"| 361
| align="right"| 60.1%
| align="right"| –
|-

| NDP
| Stuart McCall
| align="right"| 231
| align="right"| 38.9%
| align="right"| –
|-
! align=left colspan=3|Total
! align=right| 594
! align=right| 100.0%
! align=right| –

References

1942 births
2002 deaths
Canadian trade unionists
Members of the Yukon Territorial Council
Politicians from Manchester
English emigrants to Canada
British Columbia school board members
Yukon New Democratic Party politicians